Olumide Bakare (26 November 1953 – 22 April 2017) was a Nigerian actor.

Career
Bakare began his acting career in the sitcom Koko Close where he featured as Chief Koko with the Nigerian Television Authority (NTA).

Selected filmography
 Maami (2011)
 Ise Onise (2009)
 Ofin Kokonla (2005)
 Oromodie
 Last Flight to Abuja
 Kofo the first lady
 Gbogbomolo

Death
Bakare died on 22 April 2017 in Ibadan, Oyo, Nigeria due to heart and lung disease. He battled with illness for over a year and later in earlier 2017, he suffered a cardiac arrest. He was rushed to the emergency unit of University College Hospital and placed in intensive care. According to Mufu Onifade—former president of the National Association of Nigerian Theatre Arts Practitioners (NANTAP)—in his condolence message:

References

External links
 

1953 births
2017 deaths
20th-century Nigerian male actors
Male actors in Yoruba cinema
Deaths from lung disease
21st-century Nigerian male actors
Nigerian male film actors
Yoruba male actors
Nigerian male television actors
20th-century births